Sultan Abdul Halim Mu'adzam Shah International Islamic University (UniSHAMS) is a private university operating from new official campus in Kedah.

UniSHAMS offers undergraduate and postgraduate programs in various fields, including Islamic studies, Shariah, law, management, education, and information technology. The university also provides a range of research programs, with a focus on Islamic studies and Shariah.

Organisation and administration 
UniSHAMS (formerly KUIN) is wholly owned and managed by the State Government of Kedah.

Campuses and faculties  
UniSHAMS (formerly KUIN) operates from new official campus in Kuala Ketil.

Kulliyyah 
 Kulliyyah of Muamalat & Management Science
 Kulliyyah of Usuluddin & Al-Quran Science
 Kulliyyah of Shariah & Law
 Kulliyyah of Arabic Language
 Kulliyyah of Hospitality and Creative Arts
 Kulliyyah of Medicine and Health Sciences
 Centre of Islamic Finance for Education and Research (CIFER)
 Centre of Foundation Studies
 Centre for Counseling and Psychology Studies and Services
 Centre for Postgraduate Studies
 Centre for Public Studies
 Centre for Languages

References

External links 
 UniSHAMS Kedah

Baling District
Private universities and colleges in Malaysia
Universities and colleges in Kedah
Educational institutions established in 1995
1995 establishments in Malaysia
Islamic universities and colleges